Haplocochlias onaneyi is a species of sea snail, a marine gastropod mollusk in the family Skeneidae.

The Database of Western Atlantic Marine Mollusca considers this species a synonym of Haplocochlias williami.

Description

Distribution
This species occurs in the Gulf of Mexico and in the Caribbean Sea.

References

 Espinosa J., Ortea J. & Fernández-Garcés R. 2005. Descripción de tres nuevas especies del género Haplocochlias Carpenter, 1864 (Mollusca: Gastropoda). Avicennia, 17: 71–76

External links

onaneyi
Gastropods described in 2004